Lilawa is a village in northern Aleppo Governorate, northwestern Syria. Administratively belonging to Nahiya Ghandoura in Jarabulus District, the village has a population of 473 as per the 2004 census. It is located midway between al-Rai and Jarabulus, at the eastern banks of the Sajur River, immediately at the Sajur Dam. Nearby localities include Qebbet al-Turkmen to the southwest and Ghandoura to the southeast.

References

Villages in Aleppo Governorate